City University of Pasay, commonly abbreviated as CUPasay, is a city-controlled, public university in Pasadeña St., F.B. Harrison, Pasay. Its major purpose is to provide education to the less-privileged yet deserving students of the city and to some others that meet admission requirements set forth by the Board of Regents.

History
The City University of Pasay was founded on May 26, 1994, by the virtue of city ordinance. The constitution was conceptualized by Hon. Pablo N. Cuneta with the city councilors and other local officials.

The school started with 384 students and 11 faculty members, holding evening classes at the Pasay City West High School. Dr. Felimon Salas and his staff at the guidance research center composed the working group for the university. Dr. Amor Peñalosa and Dr. Estela Portugal paved the way toward the recognition of the university as an institution of higher learning leading to the approval of programs by the Commission on Higher Education (CHED). The Division of City Schools, Pasay played a significant role in the development of the university: not only the consultative service but also personnel services including the use of school facilities.

Academics
Today, the university offers degree programs in the areas of teacher education, law, business administration, nursing, health education, political science, and computer education. The School of Law is led by young and dynamic law professors with strong dedication and commitment to produce new lawyers for the country. The School of Graduate Studies offers graduate degree programs in education management and public governance.

The college serves as the research center maximizing the use of the faculty resources, data banking and research forum. All 21 faculty member are doctoral degree holders in education management and public governance. CUPasay looks forward to achieving the objectives of the city and tertiary education as well as by focusing of the area of accreditation. It is expected that this will bring about quality assurance and organizing stability.

Governance and administrative structure
The University President exercises the overall leadership in ensuring that the university's efforts are directed towards the attainment of the institutional vision, mission, goals and objectives of CUP. The President works in partnership with the four sectoral vice presidents, namely: Executive Vice Presidents, Vice President for Academic Affairs, Vice President for Administration and Vice President for Legal Affairs. Each of the vice presidents is assisted by directors and other officials for the effective implementation of their functions.

College and college deans

References

External links
 City University of Pasay

Educational institutions established in 1994
Local colleges and universities in Metro Manila
1994 establishments in the Philippines
Education in Pasay